Lehna Singh Majithia (d. 1854), his personal name is also Romanized as Lahina or Lahna, was a Sher-Gill Jat polymath, inventor, warrior, and statesman. Lehna Singh was the father of famous businessman and philanthropist, Dyal Singh Majithia.

Biography 
Sardar Lehna Singh of the renowned Majithia family was the towering Sardar of Lahore Darbar who earned the maximum number of bravery titles during his time. He was described as “the wisest man”, “the best”, “the purest”, “the most cultured”, “kind and benevolent man”, “the most enlightened”, “the most honest and able administrator of the Sikh Chiefs”. In his book “Dyal Singh Majithia: Life and Achievements”, Mr. Madan Gopal wrote, “Lehna Singh Majithia was the only Sardar with a scientific bent of mind at Maharaja Ranjit Singh’s Darbar.

He was also a skillful mechanic and original inventor. He designed a mechanism resembling a clock, showing the hour, the date, the day of the week and the phases of moon and other constellations. At the request of the Maharaja, he also modified the calendar and made a name for himself among the Indian astronomers of the time.

He had been awarded the titles of Kasir-ul-Iktidar ('Chief of Exalted Dignity') and Hasam-udaula ('the Sword of the State') by Ranjit Singh.

He left Punjab in March of 1844 for Haridwar, eventually settling in Banaras. He was arrested and kept under surveillance by the British from 23 January 1846 until the end of the First Anglo-Sikh War. He returned to Punjab in 1851 and stayed for two years before returning again to Banaras where he passed away in 1854.

Inventions 

Compass
Sikh calendar
Sikh firearms (notably pistols)
Sikh cannons, some of which were renowned as being technologically superior to the cannons the Britishers possessed
Clock-like mechanism that showed hour, weekday, date, time, moon phase, and constellations. It was called the Dhup Ghari (meaning 'sun clock')

Construction Projects 

Supervised the redecoration of the Golden Temple and the reconstruction of Amritsar during Sikh-rule
Assisted with the construction of the Summer Palace of Ranjit Singh (known as Ram Bagh)
A garden that spread over 84-acres surrounded by a high wall and a moat. It contained rare plant species

Gallery

References

External links
 A GOLDEN LEAF FROM THE ANNALS OF SIKH HISTORY

Further reading 

Indian Sikhs
People of the Sikh Empire